McKell was an electoral district of the Legislative Assembly in the Australian state of New South Wales, created in 1988, largely replacing the abolished district of Elizabeth. It was named after William McKell, former Premier of New South Wales (1941–1947). It included the majority of inner Sydney and also Lord Howe Island. It was abolished in 1991 and largely replaced by Port Jackson.

Its only representative was Sandra Nori, who later represented Port Jackson.

Members for McKell

Election results

1988

References

Mckell
Mckell
1988 establishments in Australia
Mckell
1991 disestablishments in Australia